David Roper (26 September 1944 – November 2005) was an English professional footballer who played as a goalkeeper.

Career
Born in Ilkley, Roper joined Bradford City from Salts in September 1962. He made making 13 league and 3 FA Cup appearances for the club, before leaving in 1963.

He was also an England Youth international.

Sources

References

1944 births
2005 deaths
English footballers
Salts F.C. players
Bradford City A.F.C. players
English Football League players
Association football goalkeepers
England youth international footballers